Veevers may refer to:

John Veevers (1930–2018), Australian geologist
Veevers crater, impact crater in Australia
Veever's Falls, waterfall in Hamilton, Ontario, Canada
Ken Veevers (1909–1973), former Australian rules footballer